Giandomenico Costi (born 10 March 1969, in Sassuolo) is a retired Italian professional footballer who played as a defender.

Career
Costi played for several Italian clubs throughout his career; he most notably played 2 games in the Italian Serie A for A.C. Milan during the 1990–91 season.

Honours
Milan
 UEFA Super Cup winner: 1990.
 Intercontinental Cup winner: 1990.

External links
 
 Giandomenico Costi at Romagnasport

1969 births
Living people
Italian footballers
Serie A players
Serie B players
Modena F.C. players
A.C. Milan players
Venezia F.C. players
S.S.D. Lucchese 1905 players
Brescia Calcio players
A.C.N. Siena 1904 players
U.S. Alessandria Calcio 1912 players
A.C. Ancona players
Association football defenders